Bettina Moissi (born 15 October 1923) is a German stage and film actress. She played the female lead in the 1948 film Long Is the Road, the first German film to portray the Holocaust.

Biography
Moissi was born in Berlin in October 1923, the second child of leading stage actor Alexander Moissi born in Trieste to Moisi Moisiu from Kavajë in Albania), Moissi was born in Trieste to Moisi Moisiu from Kavajë in Albania, who was a rich Albanian merchant of oil and wheat, and an Arbëresh mother, Amalia de Rada, from Trieste, daughter of a Florentine doctor. Her father was often branded as Jewish due to his name (which translates as "Moses") and his outspoken defense of his fellow Jewish actors and people during a period of growing antisemitism. She is Catholic but was married to Heinz Berggruen who was Jewish.

Personal life
In 1960, she married the art collector Heinz Berggruen. He predeceased her in 2007. They had two children:
Olivier Berggruen, curator at the Schirn Kunsthalle Frankfurt, Germany
Nicolas Berggruen, a financier and art collector

Selected filmography
 In Those Days (1947)
 Der Apfel ist ab (1948)
 Long Is the Road (1948)
 The Orplid Mystery (1950)

References

Bibliography
 Shandley, Robert R. Rubble Films: German Cinema in the Shadow of the Third Reich. Temple University Press, 2001.

External links

1923 births
Living people
20th-century German actresses
Actresses from Berlin
Berggruen family
German Catholics
German film actresses
German people of Albanian descent
German people of Austrian descent
German stage actresses
People of Arbëreshë descent